Tharla Tar Mag! is an Indian Marathi soap opera that airs on Star Pravah which premiered from 5 December 2022. It is an official remake of Tamil TV series Roja. It is directed by Sachin Gokhale and produced by Aadesh Bandekar and Suchitra Bandekar under the banner of Soham Productions.

Plot
Raised in an orphanage, Sayali’s world revolves around her foster father- Madhubhau. However, when she crosses paths with Arjun, a tragic past rears its head.

Mahaepisode (1 hour) 
 1 January 2023
 5 February 2023
 12 March 2023

Cast

Main 
 Jui Gadkari as Tanvi Killedar / Sayali Patil Killedar – Raviraj and Pratima's long-lost daughter; Madhukar's foster daughter; Arjun's Wife (2022–present)
 Amit Bhanushali as Arjun Subhedar – A criminal lawyer; Pratap and Kalpana's elder son; Asmita and Ashwin's brother; Tanvi's husband (2022–present)

Recurring 
 Priyanka Tendolkar as Priya (2022–present)
 Monika Dabade as Asmita Subhedar (2022–present)
 Pratik Suresh as Lavdya Ashwin Subhedar – Pratap and Kalpana's younger son; Asmita and Arjun's brother (2022–present)
 Narayan Jadhav as Madhukar Patil – Tanvi's foster father; founder of the Vatsalya Ashram (2022–present)
 Atul Mahajan as Pratap Subhedar – Annapurna's son; Kalpana's husband; Asmita, Arjun and Ashwin's father (2022–present)
 Prajakta Dighe-Kulkarni as Kalpana Subhedar – Pratap's wife; Asmita, Arjun and Ashwin's mother (2022–present)
 Shilpa Navalkar as Pratima Killedar – Annapurna's elder daughter; Raviraj's wife; Tanvi's mother (2022–present)
 Sagar Talashikar as Raviraj Killedar – A lawyer and businessman; Ganesh's brother; Pratima's husband; Tanvi's father (2022–present)
 Jyoti Chandekar as Annapurna Subhedar – Matriarch of Subhedar; Vidya, Pratap and Yashoda's mother; Arjun, Ashwin and Tanvi's grandmother (2022– present)
 Mira Jagannath as Sakshi - Mahipat's daughter; Priya's friend (2022–present)
 Madhav Abhyankar as Mahipat - Sakshi's father (2022–present)
 Apoorva Ranjankar as Lavdya Rakesh Killedar 
 Dnyanesh Wadekar as Ganesh Killedar 
 Shraddha Ketkar-Vartak as Suman Killedar 
 Chaitanya Sardeshpande as Chaitanya Lavdya
 Disha Danade as Kusum
 Saptashree Ugale
 Shreyas Mane

Adaptations

References

External links
 Tharla Tar Mag! at Disney+ Hotstar

Marathi-language television shows
2022 Indian television series debuts
Star Pravah original programming
Marathi-language television series based on Tamil-language television series